Rokk í Reykjavík is a documentary directed by Icelandic Friðrik Þór Friðriksson during the Icelandic winter of 1981-1982 and released for the local television in 1982.

With this documentary, Friðriksson showcases the alternative music scene through several performances of the post-punk/new wave most important bands at that time, taken from different concerts and sometimes accompanied by short interviews with musicians. The documentary portrays the lifestyle of young Icelanders opposing the establishment and advocating anarchy, as they try to find their own identity.

Rokk í Reykjavík is today considered one of the most important documentaries ever made about Icelandic music culture. It includes several bands who would go on to influence the music scene, such as Tappi Tíkarrass, a punk/pop band led by vocalist Björk Guðmundsdóttir performing two of their works: “Hrollur” and “Dúkkulísur”. The new wave band Þeyr, today considered one of the legendary Iceland bands of the early 1980s, is also featured with their songs “Rúdolf” and “Killer Boogie”, as is Einar Örn Benediktsson’s punk group Purrkur Pillnikk, also with two tracks: “Ovænt” and “Gluggagægir”.

Other important artists featured include Bubbi Morthens with his band Egó, Fræbbblarnir, Grýlurnar, and the renowned Sveinbjörn Beinteinsson with his chanting poem “Rímur”, among others.

As this film was the first Icelandic work in Dolby Stereo, it brought innovation to the Icelandic film industry. With Íslenska kvikmyndasamsteypan as the distributor, Rokk í Reykjavík was released in VHS format. The soundtrack to this film was released as a double LP compilation by Hugrenningur in April 1982.

The cover artwork depicts singer Björk performing with Tappi Tíkarrass.

In July 2008 the movie was released on DVD by Sena in Iceland only.

Songs

Credits

Personnel
Direction: Friðrik Þór Friðriksson.
Cinematography and lightning: Ari Kristinsson.
Other shooting personnel: Árni Páll Jóhannsson, Baldur Hrafnkell Jónsson, Friðrik Þór Friðriksson, Jón Karl Helgason, Magnús Magnússon, Peter Auspin, Richard Crowe, Sigurður Grímsson, Sigurður Snæberg Jónsson, Sigurjón Sighvatsson, Vilhjálmur Knudsen and Þorgeir Gunnarsson.
Recording engineers from Þursabit recording studio: Júlíus Agnarsson, Tómas Magnús Tómasson, Þórður Árnason.
Sound: Jón Karl Helgason.
Edition: Ari Kristinsson, Kristín Pálsdóttir, Peter Auspin, Richard Crowe, Sigurður Grímsson, Sigurður Jón Ólafsson, Sigurður Snæberg Jónsson.
Executive board: Þorgeir Gunnarsson.
Mixing: Alan Snelling, Þórður Árnason.
Sound production: Anvil Studios, Abbey Road, London.
Video production: Johan Ankerstjerne a/s, Kaupmannahöfn.
Distributor: Íslenska kvikmyndasamsteypan.

Soundtrack: Title: Rokk í Reykjavík. Label: Hugrenningur in 1982. Reissue: in 1993 by Bad Taste.

See also
1982 - Rokk í Reykjavík (Hugrenningur), the soundtrack.
2005 Screaming Masterpiece documentary about Iceland's music scene.

References

External links
 

1982 films
Icelandic documentary films
1980s Icelandic-language films
Films directed by Friðrik Þór Friðriksson
1982 documentary films